Oshio may refer to:

Oshio Station (Fukui)
Japanese destroyer Oshio
Ōshio Kenji, a Japanese former sumo wrestler
Kotaro Oshio, a Japanese acoustic guitarist
Manabu Oshio, Japanese singer and actor

Japanese-language surnames